The Burkiss Way is a BBC Radio 4 sketch comedy series, originally broadcast between August 1976 and November 1980. It was written by Andrew Marshall and David Renwick, with additional material in seasons 1 and 2 by John Mason, Colin Bostock-Smith, Douglas Adams, John Lloyd, Tom Magee Englefield and Liz Pollock.

The first season of the show starred Denise Coffey, Chris Emmett, Nigel Rees and Fred Harris. From season 2 onwards, the show starred Jo Kendall, Chris Emmett, Nigel Rees and Fred Harris. The series had three producers, announced as "Simon Brett of Stepney", "John Lloyd of Europe", and "David 'Hatch of the BBC' Hatch".

The show's humour was based on surrealism and literary and media parodies, sprinkled with puns.

Format

The series had its roots in two half-hour sketch shows entitled Half-Open University which Marshall and Renwick had written with Mason for Radio 3 as a parody of Open University programmes. The first, broadcast on 25 August 1975, spoofed science, the second, on 1 January 1976 and repeated on 1 December that year, history.

In a similar vein, The Burkiss Way was styled around fictional correspondence courses by "Professor Emil Burkiss" entitled The Burkiss Way to Dynamic Living, and each episode or "lesson" had a number and a title based on one of the course's subjects: "Lesson 1: Peel Bananas the Burkiss Way", "Lesson 2: Pass Examinations the Burkiss Way", and so on. Although the numbers and titles were maintained throughout the run, a significant change of style early in the second series saw the radio correspondence course become a hook rather than a narrative device, and it was mentioned only in passing.

From here on the programme continued in a more conventional sketch format, though it was to use increasingly Pythonesque devices including surreal, stream-of-consciousness linking, back-referencing and aggregation. Like the Pythons before them, the writers lampooned and tinkered with the medium on which the show was broadcast, including spoofs of Radio 4's continuity style. Many later episodes had false endings, sometimes disguised as genuine continuity announcements. The opening and closing credits might be anywhere within the show. One show ran backwards from the closing to the opening credits, while another was allegedly dropped, broken and glued together with a tube of BBC coffee, resulting in disjointed running order with many sketches beginning and ending in mid-sentence. For one pair of shows, one sentence was split over two programmes, with 'Eric..' ending lesson 37 and '..Pode of Croydon' starting lesson 38.

As time went on the show became increasingly surreal, and in several sketches, the writers seemed to see how many strange ideas they could cram into a sketch. For example, one later episode contains a sketch about an amoeba employed by the Department of Civil Service Staff Recruitment and Fisheries as a token Desmond Dekker and the Aces but who keeps reproducing asexually by mitosis while singing a Lee Dorsey song.

Contributors
In the first series, Chris Emmett made several appearances as a dirty old man; in episode 2, his character became prime minister thanks to the Burkiss Way. The fourth episode of series one, "Solve Murders the Burkiss Way", featured the voice as "Eric Pode of Croydon" as a disguise of mass-murderess "Beatrice Crint of Chingford". The same voice was used in the next episode, "Keep Unfit the Burkiss Way", as "Ron Pode of Hackney" and from series 2 this voice resumed as Eric Pode of Croydon, becoming one of the show's few recurring characters and the only one not a parody of a real person. He is a man with unsavoury habits, inspired by Round the Horne's "J. Peasemold Gruntfuttock". Each week he is interviewed by Fred Harris's character, who calls him Mister Croydon, is disgusted by his habits and puns, and always remarks, "isn't he a panic". This was one of the show's two catchphrases, the other being "there will now be a short intermission". There was usually a series of linked sketches through each episode, the intermission sketches providing a break.

The fact that Douglas Adams had written for the show did not prevent his becoming a target for satire. He was parodied as Mister Different Adams whose catchphrase is "I see comedy as a kind of...". Adams's The Hitchhiker's Guide to the Galaxy was also a target; the 1979 Christmas show (Eric Pode of Croydon's Easter Special) closes with Peter Jones as his HHGTTG character, The Book, attempting to vilify BBC Radio 4 for broadcasting The Burkiss Way, but in typical fashion, he is cut off in mid-sentence.

Broadcast history

The Burkiss Way ran to 47 episodes in six series, but the episode and series numbering are derailed by "Lesson 31" and "Lesson 32", which are a single episode masquerading as two half-episodes, the first of which ends series 3 and the second of which begins series 4. There are two "Lesson 39"s, both entitled "Repeat Yourself the Burkiss Way", which have identical beginnings. The consequence is that "Lesson 33" to the first "Lesson 39" inclusive have lesson numbers that are one greater than the cumulative number; from the second "Lesson 39" onward the correct numbering is restored.

A sketch in Lesson 28 featuring unsubtle references to newscaster Reginald Bosanquet's alcoholism was cut following the first broadcast and was never reinstated. The last episode was cut short by 6 minutes on its first repeat transmission, on the instructions of the controller of BBC Radio 4. The missing material lampooned the grovelling approach of Radio 4 to the Queen Mother's 80th birthday celebrations. Repeats on BBC7 remained censored until a restored version was first broadcast in Celebrate The Burkiss Way on BBC7 on Saturday 4 April 2009.

The show gained a cult following and has several reruns on BBC 7 / BBC Radio 4 Extra. Listeners complained about some omissions, which may indicate that episodes have been lost or wiped – notably Lesson 6 – and episodes 7 to 27 inclusive have been broadcast in mono, suggesting the original stereo masters were wiped. The suggestion is, however, false as the BBC is known to have all episodes in its archive, though it is unusual for the early shows to be made in stereo and then some later shows to be only in mono. Lesson 6 is unique in being only 15 minutes long, which makes it difficult to accommodate in R4 Extra's schedule.

Episode list

† Lessons 31 and 32 were in fact a single 30-minute show masquerading as two 15-minute episodes.

‡ The two lessons numbered 39 with identical titles were different, but started exactly the same way. 

Because of these anomalies, all of the episodes between Lesson 33 and the first Lesson 39 have lesson numbers that are one greater than the actual half-hour episode numeration.

Releases and other media

A book, Bestseller! The Life and Death of Eric Pode of Croydon, was published by Allen & Unwin in 1981, loosely based on sketches from the series.

A BBC Radio Collection in 1994 contained excerpts rather than complete episodes.

A BBC Radio Collection in 2010 contained the complete first series.

Reception
In his 1981 book, Laughter in the Air: An Informal History of British Radio Comedy, Barry Took described The Burkiss Way as "an irreverent, surreal romp through the conscious and unconscious mind" and, on presenting extracts from the scripts, wrote "you really need a full half-hour to absorb the constant shifts of attitude and changes of direction."

In 2018, Rob Grant claimed he "really admired The Burkiss Way," saying "it was a terrifically funny show and I loved it."

See also

 End of Part One (a TV show in a similar style by the same writers)

References

External links
Radiomusications — The Burkiss Way
How to write a web site the Burkiss Way

BBC Radio comedy programmes
British radio sketch shows
BBC Radio 4 programmes
1976 radio programme debuts
1980 radio programme endings